Stephen Douglas McMichael (born October 17, 1957), nicknamed "Mongo", "Ming" and "Ming the Merciless", is an American former professional football player, sports broadcaster, and professional wrestler.

McMichael played college football for the University of Texas at Austin and was an All-American. Professionally, he played in the National Football League (NFL) for the New England Patriots, Chicago Bears and Green Bay Packers as a defensive tackle, winning Super Bowl XX with the Bears in January 1986. During his professional wrestling career, McMichael was known for his time in World Championship Wrestling (WCW). He became a member of the legendary Four Horsemen stable and was a one-time WCW United States Champion.

From 2007 to 2013, McMichael was the head coach of the Chicago Slaughter of the Continental Indoor Football League (CIFL). In 2013, lost his campaign for mayor of Romeoville, Illinois. McMichael has been a regular presence on Chicago sports radio for several years and is currently the namesake of a restaurant in the southwest suburbs of Chicago.

Early life
McMichael was born on October 17, 1957 in Houston, Texas. His parents separated before his second birthday, and his mother later remarried E.V. McMichael, an oil company executive whose surname McMichael adopted. He has three other siblings: older brother John Richard and younger sisters Kathy and Sharon. The family moved to Freer, where he attended Freer High School. In his senior year, he lettered in six sports: football, basketball, baseball, track, tennis and golf. Baseball was his preferred sport, and whilst playing as a catcher, he batted .450 in his senior year, garnering attention from the St. Louis Cardinals and Cincinnati Reds.

College football career
McMichael's performances for his high school football team saw him being offered scholarships by 75 institutions. He decided to attend the University of Texas at Austin. He played as a defensive tackle for the Texas Longhorns football team from 1976 to 1979, but his freshman season was marred by the death of his stepfather. In his senior season, he was a consensus first-team All-American, and he was defensive MVP at the 1979 Hula Bowl.

On July 17, 2010, McMichael was inducted into the College Football Hall of Fame.

Professional football career
McMichael was drafted out of Texas in 1980 by the New England Patriots but cut before his second season. The Chicago Bears signed him as a free agent in 1981. He became one of their starting defensive tackles and helped lead them to a Super Bowl win in 1985. He had a streak of 101 games started until 1990, when his playing time was reduced. He led the Bears with 11 sacks in 1988. He had 108 tackles in 1989. McMichael was named to the NFC's Pro Bowl teams for the 1986 and 1987 seasons.

McMichael gained notability in a 1991 game against the New York Jets. With the Bears down 13–6 with 1:54 remaining, McMichael forced a Blair Thomas fumble and recovered it at the New York 36. Quarterback Jim Harbaugh then threw a game-tying touchdown to Neal Anderson with :18 left in the game. The Bears went on to win in overtime when Harbaugh scored on a 1-yard TD run. Bears coach Mike Ditka said in 2005 that McMichael was the toughest player he had ever coached. He played with the Green Bay Packers in 1994 before retiring.

{{cquote|"Thank God New England got rid of me. Some teams, they want you to have a certain image. Other teams, like this one, they just want you to get down and dirty. I'm really proud to be a Bear. The Patriots, yeah, they thought I was a little weird. And I guess I am. But here they don't care, long as you play hard. The town, the coach, the team — it's Steve McMichael. I wouldn't want to be anywhere else."|source=McMichael in 1984, speaking to the Chicago Tribunes Bob Verdi}}

Professional wrestling career
World Wrestling Federation (1995)
After the end of his NFL career, he appeared at ringside in the WWF for Lawrence Taylor at WrestleMania XI on April 2, 1995, in Hartford, Connecticut. Taylor was wrestling Bam Bam Bigelow and there were several football players at ringside to keep wrestlers from interfering in the match. During the March 20 episode of Monday Night Raw, McMichael provided guest commentary with Vince McMahon and would later brawl with Kama Mustafa, one of Bigelow's comrades. The fight was all over the arena floor and almost into the stands, knocking over the broadcast table, soon being broken up by personnel. Taylor ended up winning the later match.

World Championship Wrestling (1995–1999)
 Color commentator (1995–1996) 
In 1995, McMichael was hired by World Championship Wrestling (WCW). On September 4, 1995, he made his debut with the company as the pro-babyface color commentator on the premiere of WCW Monday Nitro, with Bobby Heenan fulfilling his typical pro-heel commentator role alongside lead broadcaster Eric Bischoff. McMichael would root for the popular wrestlers during matches, would bicker with Heenan on a regular basis, and brought his dog Pepe with him to the broadcast booth.

 The Four Horsemen (1996–1997) 

In April 1996, Ric Flair started hitting on McMichael's wife Debra, who would sit at ringside during WCW Monday Nitro. McMichael challenged Flair and Arn Anderson to a match with his partner Kevin Greene. He trained with Randy Savage (he was actually trained by Terry Taylor at the WCW Power Plant), while Flair and Anderson got Heenan to be their coach for the match.

The match took place at The Great American Bash. During the match, Debra and Greene's wife were chased to the back by Woman and Miss Elizabeth, who were Flair's valets. Debra came back with Woman and Elizabeth, and she had a briefcase full of money and a Four Horsemen T-shirt. McMichael accepted it and hit Greene in the head with the briefcase. McMichael's first singles match was against Joe Gomez at Bash at the Beach.

He went on to feud with the Dungeon of Doom with the other Horsemen, and he had problems with Jeff Jarrett over the affections of Debra in late 1996 through early 1997. Women would trash Debra, causing McMichael and Chris Benoit to step in each time. The turning point in the McMichael–Jarrett feud was at SuperBrawl VII. McMichael wrestled Jarrett, and if Jarrett won, he was an official Horseman. Debra interfered for Jarrett, so he would win. Then McMichael and Jarrett had to team, and they bickered at first but later became a solid tag team. McMichael wrestled two football players in 1997. He beat Reggie White at Slamboree and lost to Kevin Greene at The Great American Bash, which saw McMichael slapped by Greene's mother at ringside.

In July 1997, Jarrett was kicked out of the Horsemen, and Debra soon left McMichael for Jarrett. McMichael got his revenge when he defeated Jarrett for his WCW United States Heavyweight Championship on the August 21 episode of Clash of the Champions XXXV. Just weeks earlier, Arn Anderson had been forced to retire due to an injury, and Curt Hennig took his place in the Horsemen. At Fall Brawl, Hennig turned on the Horsemen and joined the nWo, during the War Games match that the Horsemen were involved in. McMichael was handcuffed to the steel cage surrounding the ring along with Benoit, and neither man could defend Flair from the 5-on-1 assault from the nWo; the match ended after McMichael surrendered to stop the nWo from attacking Flair, although Hennig would still slam the cage door on Flair's head (which was edited out of the home video release, but included on the WWE Network in full), even after the submission was made. The next night on Nitro, McMichael dropped his United States title to Hennig, and Flair disbanded the Horsemen.

 Various rivalries and departure (1997–1999) 
McMichael went after Debra's stable of wrestlers that included Jarrett, Eddie Guerrero and Alex Wright. Debra hired Goldberg to get McMichael, and he became one of Goldberg's first victims in November 1997. Goldberg stole McMichael's Super Bowl ring and weeks later McMichael hit Goldberg with a pipe and reclaimed it. He briefly helped Benoit feud with Raven's Flock in January 1998 and then got into a feud with The British Bulldog, in which he broke his hand during a match at SuperBrawl VIII in February 1998. McMichael returned in June and had a feud with Stevie Ray and helped reform the Four Horsemen in October with Flair, Benoit, Dean Malenko and manager Arn Anderson. They feuded with the nWo until McMichael made his final appearance on the February 8, 1999 episode of Nitro.

Total Nonstop Action Wrestling (2008)
McMichael returned to professional wrestling for Total Nonstop Action Wrestling's flagship pay-per-view, Bound For Glory, where he refereed the Monster's Ball Match. This match was notable for McMichael's extremely slow cadence for a three count.

Other endeavors
McMichael co-hosted a Bears pre-game show with Jeff Dickerson on ESPN 1000 in Chicago. He was the head coach of the Chicago Slaughter of the Indoor Football League from 2007 until the team's final season in 2013.

On August 7, 2001, during the seventh-inning stretch of a game between the Chicago Cubs and the Colorado Rockies at Wrigley Field, McMichael, who was visiting the Cubs television booth, took a turn as the guest singer for "Take Me Out to the Ball Game". Earlier in the game in the bottom of the 6th inning, home plate umpire Ángel Hernández had controversially called Cubs infielder Ron Coomer out at the plate. Before singing Take Me Out to the Ball Game, McMichael announced to those in attendance over the PA system that he would "have some speaks" with Hernández after the game, presumably as a result of Hernández's call on Coomer. Crew chief Randy Marsh ordered McMichael to be ejected from the ballpark, and the umpires later received an apology for McMichael's conduct from then-Cubs general manager Andy MacPhail.

On August 16, 2012, McMichael announced his intentions to run for mayor of Romeoville, Illinois. He lost the race to incumbent John Noak, garnering 39 percent of the vote.

Personal life
In 1985, McMichael married Debra Marshall. They divorced on October 12, 1998.

On March 24, 2001, McMichael married Misty Davenport. On August 3, 2007, McMichael appeared as a guest on the Waddle & Silvy Show on ESPN 1000 and announced he is going to be a father with his wife. Their daughter Macy Dale McMichael was born at 4:12 pm on January 22, 2008.

McMichael and fellow 1985 Chicago Bears alumni Dan Hampton and Otis Wilson performed in a rock and roll oldies band (with entertaining satirical Mike Ditka verses) called the Chicago 6.

On April 23, 2021, McMichael announced that he was diagnosed with amyotrophic lateral sclerosis (ALS). In the announcement, he also confirmed that he would be retiring from making public appearances going forward. The announcement came six months after one of McMichael's contemporaries in the NFL, former Pittsburgh Steelers offensive tackle & broadcaster Tunch Ilkin, announced his own ALS diagnosis; Ilkin died of ALS complications on September 4, 2021, at the age of 63. Despite not making any more public appearances, with his and his family's permission, photos of McMichael being visited by former teammates and wrestlers have surfaced on social media, which have received criticism from fans due to McMichael's declining health.

Championships and accomplishments

American footballNational Football LeagueSuper Bowl XX Champion (with the Chicago Bears)
Two-time First Team All-Pro (1985, 1987)
Two-time Pro Bowl selection (1986, 1987)
Gridiron Greats Hall of Fame inductee (class of 2019)National Collegiate Athletics Association1979 All-American
College Football Hall of Fame inductee (class of 2009)

Professional wrestlingWorld Championship WrestlingWCW United States Heavyweight Championship (1 time)Wrestling Observer Newsletter'''''
Worst Television Announcer (1996)

References

External links
 

1957 births
20th-century professional wrestlers
All-American college football players
American color commentators
American football defensive linemen
American male professional wrestlers
Chicago Bears players
College Football Hall of Fame inductees
Green Bay Packers players
Indoor Football League coaches
Living people
National Conference Pro Bowl players
New England Patriots players
NWA/WCW/WWE United States Heavyweight Champions
People from Romeoville, Illinois
People with motor neuron disease
Players of American football from Houston
Professional wrestling announcers
Sportspeople from Houston
Texas Longhorns football players
The Four Horsemen (professional wrestling) members